The enzyme  3-oxolaurate decarboxylase catalyzes the chemical reaction

3-oxododecanoate  2-undecanone + CO2

This enzyme belongs to the family of lyases, specifically the carboxy-lyases, which cleave carbon-carbon bonds.  The systematic name of this enzyme class is 3-oxododecanoate carboxy-lyase (2-undecanone-forming). Other names in common use include beta-ketolaurate decarboxylase, beta-ketoacyl decarboxylase, and 3-oxododecanoate carboxy-lyase.

References

 

EC 4.1.1
Enzymes of unknown structure